Chassigny may refer to:

 Chassigny (meteorite), a Martian meteorite that fell in 1815
 Chassigny, Haute-Marne, a village and commune in north-eastern France
 Chassigny-sous-Dun, a commune in central France